Bronisławka may refer to the following places:
Bronisławka, Puławy County in Lublin Voivodeship (east Poland)
Bronisławka, Zamość County in Lublin Voivodeship (east Poland)
Bronisławka, Nowy Dwór Mazowiecki County in Masovian Voivodeship (east-central Poland)
Bronisławka, Żyrardów County in Masovian Voivodeship
Bronisławka, Greater Poland Voivodeship (west-central Poland)